Miroszka  is a village in the administrative district of Gmina Niechanowo, within Gniezno County, Greater Poland Voivodeship, in west-central Poland. The village has a population of 100.

References

Miroszka